The Diocese of Gradisca (Latin: Dioecesis Gradisca) was a Roman Catholic diocese located in the town of Gradisca d'Isonzo in the Province of Gorizia in Friuli-Venezia Giulia for the short-lived union (only three years) of the Dioceses of Trieste, Gorizia and Pedena. In 1791, it was united with the re-established Archdiocese of Gorizia to form the Archdiocese of Gorizia e Gradisca. In 1986, it was restored as the  Titular Archiepiscopal See of Gradisca.

Bishops
Franz Philipp von Inzaghi (1788–1791 Appointed, Bishop of Gorizia e Gradisca)

See also
Catholic Church in Italy
Roman Catholic Diocese of Pedena
Roman Catholic Diocese of Trieste

References

Former Roman Catholic dioceses in Italy